X21 may refer to:

Northrop X-21, an experimental aircraft
SA-X-21 or S-400 (missile), a Russian anti-aircraft weapon system
X.21 (sometimes referred to as X21), an interface specification for differential communications
X21 (band) (次世代ユニット), a Japanese girl idol group